Åke Stenborg (27 February 1926 – 4 April 2010) was a Swedish chess player, Swedish Chess Championship winner (1956).

Biography
Åke Stenborg was born in the town of Torshälla, but he lived most of his life in Eskilstuna. He was a multiple champion of the city chess club. In Swedish Chess Championships Åke Stenborg has won gold (1956) medal. Despite serious sporting achievements, Stenborg was an amateur chess player and acted in competitions in his free time.

Åke Stenborg received an engineering education and worked first in the company ASEA, and then in the company Bahco. For some time he represented the interests of Bahco in  Santa Fe (Argentina).

Åke Stenborg played for Sweden in the Chess Olympiads:
 In 1950, at second reserve board in the 9th Chess Olympiad in Dubrovnik (+3, =0, -3),
 In 1956, at second board in the 12th Chess Olympiad in Moscow (+2, =9, -3).

Åke Stenborg played for Sweden in the European Team Chess Championship preliminaries:
 In 1961, at seventh board in the 2nd European Team Chess Championship preliminaries (+0, =1, -3).

References

External links

Åke Stenborg chess games at 365chess.com

1926 births
2010 deaths
People from Eskilstuna
Swedish chess players
Chess Olympiad competitors